Carlton in Cleveland is a village in the Hambleton district of North Yorkshire, England, and on the edge of the North York Moors National Park. The village is commonly known as Carlton, and is the only village in the civil parish of Carlton.

The population of the parish at the 2011 Census was recorded at 399 and was estimated at 300 in 2013.

Carlton in Cleveland has a school, Carlton and Faceby Primary School, and a public house, the Blackwell Ox, but no longer has a post office or shop. Carlton Outdoor Education Centre within the village provides activities for children. Successful National Hunt jockey Brian Hughes lives in the village

History 
Carlton was first mentioned in the Domesday Book in 1086.  By the 14th century it had become known as Karleton in Clyveland (Carlton in Cleveland), to distinguish the place from other places named Carlton.  "Cleveland" refers to the historic region of Cleveland.  The village did not form part of the county of Cleveland during its brief existence from 1974 to 1996.

In the Middle Ages it appears that Carlton was a chapelry in the parish of Rudby, but by 1611 Carlton had its own church, and was considered a separate parish.  The present church, dedicated to St Botolph, was completed in 1897.  It was designed by Temple Moore, and is a Grade II listed building.

The Cleveland Hills which lie to the south of the village are known colloquially as 'Carlton Banks'. They were the site of Alum extraction and a small works. During the 1950s the abandoned workings became a small but popular Motorcycling Scramble track. Adjacent to it is the renowned 'Lord Stones Country Park'.

On 10 August 2003, a thunderstorm dropped  of rain on the village in less than 13 minutes. The recording is held by the Met Office to be the most accurate rainfall measurement in the British Isles. The accuracy is maintained because the Meteorological Office have a monitoring station in the village.

Notable people
Barry Dodd, entrepreneur and Lord Lieutenant of North Yorkshire, lived at Busby Hall briefly in 2018

References

External links

Villages in North Yorkshire
Hambleton District